King Adongo Agada Akwai Cham (January 1, 1959 – November 30, 2011) was King of the approx. 96,000 Anuak people of South Sudan and the corresponding Western Ethiopian border region.  He is the 23rd King of the Anuak Nyiudola Royal Dynasty and was considered by some of the Anuak to be a demigod.

Former teacher in Sudan and factory-worker in Canada, he succeeded his father who was king for almost 60 years.  Cham had been living in Ottawa, Ontario, Canada as a refugee from Sudan's civil war when he was called back to Sudan to take the throne in 2001.  He ruled from the village of Otalo where he had constructed the kingdom's first school, clinic and airstrip.

The King died on November 30, 2011 at a hospital in Nairobi, Kenya.

" The Man Who Became King (2007 SAF): Adongo Adaga was just another South Sudanese exile living in Canada at the turn of the 21st century, until he received word that he was needed back home. This compelling documentary takes a look at the challenges facing Adaga, who desperately wanted to relocate his family from his homeland to Canada but was instead called to serve as the king of a tribe in his native South Sudan. A large tribe of several hundred thousand subsistence farmers, the Anyuak needed him to settle outstanding issues, such as their strained relationship with neighboring tribes and the difficulties faced by their fellow Anyuak across the border in Ethiopia. The film focuses on Adaga's efforts to balance the needs of his people with the needs and safety of his immediate family, and his grace under pressure should be a lesson for us all." 2

See also
South Sudanese Canadians

References

External links
The Man Who Became King - Sundance Channel documentary
Accession of the Refugee King
A Brief Moment with the King, Adongo Agada Akway Cham
Majesty King Adongo Agada Has Passed On

1959 births
South Sudanese refugees
Sudanese refugees
Nilotic peoples
South Sudanese expatriates in Canada
Sudanese expatriates in Canada
2011 deaths